Based in Park City, Utah, the Nodance Film Festival was founded as an alternative to the Sundance Film Festival and celebrates the alternative digital film culture, with an emphasis on first-time filmmakers and digital filmmaking. Held annually in Park City, Utah, it is the world's first DVD-projected film festival. In 2003, it was sold to actor/director Forest Whitaker, and is currently on hiatus pending relaunch. It ran for six years, while also hosting a screenplay competition, online program, and traveling roadshow.

External links
Nodance.com

Film festivals in Utah
Internet film festivals
Digital film festivals